Fredrik Andersson (born 28 February 1968) is a former Swedish ice hockey goaltender. He currently serves as head coach for Timrå IK of the Swedish Hockey League.

References

External links
Fredrik Andersson on Elite Prospects
MODO Hockey's official website

1968 births
Living people
Buffalo Sabres scouts
EC Kapfenberg players
Modo Hockey players
Swedish ice hockey goaltenders
Timrå IK players
Wiener EV players